Frank Henry Manogue (April 30, 1882 – May 13, 1948) was an American politician in the state of Washington. He served in the Washington House of Representatives.

References

Republican Party members of the Washington House of Representatives
1882 births
1948 deaths
20th-century American politicians